Electrasy are an English rock band. Formed in 1994 in Dorset, UK, the band consisted of vocalist Alisdair (Ali) McKinnell, guitarists Nigel Nisbet and Steve Atkins, bassist Alex Meadows (who joined the band before they recorded In Here We Fall), drummer Paul Pridmore and keyboardist Jim Hayden (who left the band by May 2001). The band were active until 2002, although several members of the band still based in the UK after this time continued to perform occasional gigs. Nigel Nisbet has subsequently released four solo albums, Calling All The Dreamers in 2007, Musicians are Different in 2015, Mainstream Panic in 2016 and Falling from the Stars in 2018. Alex Meadows has also released recent solo material under the name The Inexperienced, and is also a regular performer with various other acts (Tom Jones, Il Divo). Electrasy released a new album on July 1, 2021, entitled Givin' It Back, including multiple remasters and a live recording of their 1998 single Best Friend's Girl.

Career
Electrasy achieved UK Singles Chart success with "Morning Afterglow" (reached number 19 and later number 49 in the US Rock charts in 2000), and released two major label albums, 1998's Beautiful Insane in the UK and 2000's In Here We Fall in the US "Morning Afterglow" was on both albums and a new version of "Angel" was recorded for In Here We Fall. Recording began for their third album Wired for Dreaming in 2001, but due to trouble with their record labels – first MCA/Universal UK and then Arista in the U.S. – delayed release of the third album, until it was finally released on physical format in 2007 with the help of Pink Hedgehog Records.

During their career, Electrasy played over 180 shows in 1998, including a live performance on TFI Friday and appearing on the Other Stage at the Glastonbury Festival in 1999. The band were also voted #2 NEW ARTIST OF 1999 by WBRU's listeners, and in the Top Songs Of 99 chart, "Morning Afterglow" came in at #7, and "Best Friend's Girl" came at #63.

In Here We Fall features a cover of the Led Zeppelin song "Dazed and Confused". The song "Cosmic Castaway", from the same album, was also featured on the soundtrack album of the 2000 animated film Titan A.E. In addition, their song "Renegades" can be heard in the final scene and credits of the 2001 film Monkeybone.

In 2013, the band released a previously unreleased version of the song "Today's the Day" for Pink Hedgehog Records' compilation album Close to the Hedge, featuring various artists. This version of the song was originally recorded in 1997 as part of the pre-production for the album Beautiful Insane.

According to The Guinness Book Of Records, Electrasy won an award for having 4,400 custard pies thrown in three minutes featuring members of the Official Laurel and Hardy fan club, which was also part of the music video to their single "Best Friend's Girl".

Discography

Albums

Singles

References

External links
 Official website
 
 [ Allmusic entry for Electrasy]
 https://web.archive.org/web/20020119131218/http://www.electrasy.org/

British rock music groups
Musical groups established in 1994
Musical groups disestablished in 2002
Musical groups reestablished in 2021
1994 establishments in England